Aracena Island (Spanish: Isla Capitán Aracena or Isla Aracena) is an island in the Magallanes Region of Chile. It belongs to the Tierra del Fuego archipelago, and forms part of the Alberto de Agostini National Park.

For some 6000 years the coastal areas of Aracena Island have been inhabited by the Alacalufe (or Kawésqar) people. By the early years of the 21st century, the continued presence of the Alacalufe has been put seriously at risk by the actions of non-indigenous people.

The highest point on Aracena Island is Mount Vernal. (The United States Hydrographic Office in South America Pilot (Year 1916, page 316) erroneously located Mount Vernal on the Clarence Island.)

References

Islands of Tierra del Fuego